Nebria fulviventris is a species of ground beetle in the Nebriinae subfamily that is endemic to Italy.

References

External links
Nebria fulviventris at Fauna Europaea

fulviventris
Beetles described in 1834
Beetles of Europe